The Federal Board is the governing body of the Liberal Democrats. It is chaired by the party president, currently Mark Pack, and includes members of the party-at-large elected every three years in an all-member ballot, as well as representatives from the state parties, MPs, peers, MEPs, and councillors. Until 2017 it was known as the Federal Executive. From November 2022, it will be re-constituted, with a Federal Council added to provide scrutiny.

Current membership
 Chair: Mark Pack
 English Party Chair: Alison Rouse
 Scottish Party Convenor: Sheila Ritchie
 Welsh Party Chair: Paula Yates
 Leader: Ed Davey
 Peer Representative: Lord Strasburger
 MP Representative: Christine Jardine
 MP Representative: Munira Wilson
 Chair of FFRC and Registered Treasurer: Tony Harris
 Chair of FPDC: Bess Mayhew
 Vice-chair of FPDC: Jeremy Hargreaves
 Chair of FCC: Nicholas Da Costa
 Chair of FIRC: Phil Bennion
 Chair of FCEC: Lisa Smart
 Chair of FASC: Helena Cole
 Vice-president: Isabelle Parasram

Councillor representatives
 Chris White

State Party representatives
 English Party: Lisa-Maria Bornemann
 Scottish Party: Fiona Campbell Trevor
 Welsh Party: Bill Powell

SAO Representative
 Young Liberals: Eleanor KellyDirectly Elected:Non-voting Members Chief Executive: Mike Dixon
 Staff Representative: Will Dyer
 LGA Representative: Terry Stacey
 Honorary Treasurer: Tilly McAuliffe
 Chief Whip: Wendy Chamberlain MP
 Company Secretary''': Jack Coulson

Steering Committee
Following the Thornhill Review, in the summer of 2020 the Board agreed to pilot the operation of a new Steering Group. It has 14 members, these are:
 Mark Pack (President)
 Ed Davey (Leader)
 Alison Rouse (English Party Chair)
 Sheila Richie (Scottish Party Convener)
 Paula Yates (Welsh Party Chair)
 Chris White (Councillor Representative)
 Barbara Gibson (FPDC Chair)
 Elaine Bagshaw (Directly Elected Representative)
 Geoff Payne (FCC Chair)
 Jeremy Hargreaves (FPC Vice-Chair)
 Lisa Smart (FCEC Chair)
 Tony Harris (Treasurer)
 Eleanor Kelly (Young Liberals Chair)
 Isabelle Parasram (Vice-President)

References

Organisation of the Liberal Democrats (UK)